Nickelodeon is an Australian children's pay television channel operated by a joint venture of Foxtel Networks and Paramount Networks UK & Australia. Being a version of the namesake television channel in the United States, the channel broadcasts Nickelodeon's original series, as well as shows from third-party companies.

The Australian version also offers a timeshift schedule to viewers in New Zealand since 1 December 2010; the New Zealand-specific version of Nickelodeon ceased broadcasting a day before.

History

Nickelodeon was launched on 23 October 1995, replacing the Max and ClassicMax channels, offering live action shows and cartoons. Originally the channel timeshared with Nick at Nite which began at 8 on weekdays and 10 pm on weekends, and ended at 6 am. From 1 July 1998, the channel gained an extra half-hour on weekdays, moving Nick at Nite back to. 8.30 pm. On 2 January 2000, the channel introduced "More Nick", extending its broadcast hours to 10 pm every night of the week. Eventually in July/August 2000, Nick at Nite closed and Nickelodeon began broadcasting for 24 hours every day. After that, almost all of Nick at Nite's programming moved to TV1. Nickelodeon was also added to the Optus Television service in December 2002.

On 14 March 2004, Nick Jr. launched as the first full, 24-hour TV channel designed for pre-school audiences in Australia. Before this, Nick Jr. was a morning and afternoon programming block on Nickelodeon, including shows that now get much more airtime on the full channel, such as Dora the Explorer and PAW Patrol. For a few months after Nick Jr. became a full channel, it kept a 2-hour-long time slot on Nickelodeon, but it was drastically shorter than it was before it became a full channel. Nickelodeon and Nick Jr. began broadcasting in Widescreen on 2 March 2009.

During Kids Choice Awards 2010 Nickelodeon Australia rebranded the network with the new one using completely different bumpers than America's channel however the iCarly bumper with slime has been used in most advertisement breaks. The Nick Shack rebranded much earlier before the channel itself. On 1 December 2010, Nickelodeon Australia launched in New Zealand, replacing Nickelodeon New Zealand. On 30 July 2013, Nickelodeon Australia became available on the newly launched Australian IPTV service Foxtel Play, making it one of the first channels to be available via the service.

On 3 December 2013, Nickelodeon Australia became available on Foxtel's streaming service Foxtel Go. On 1 January 2014, Nickelodeon Australia launched on Australian IPTV provider FetchTV.

From September 2020, a 12-hour block of Nickelodeon and Nick Jr. programming will be made available to free-to-air television on the newly-launched 10 Shake multichannel, operated by free-to-air sister channel 10.

Programming
Nickelodeon Australia mainly airs shows from its US counterpart such as SpongeBob SquarePants and The Loud House. The channel also broadcasts a variety of non-US and locally produced shows, some of which are detailed below. Other locally produced shows not included below are Nick Takes Over Your School, as well as an Australian version of Nick GAS. There are several local productions. Hot Chunks starring Angus King as a variety of characters., Camp Orange launched in 2005 and was hosted by Dave Lawson. The adventure camp reality series features teams of kids competing in the great outdoors, using their wits to win prizes. The second, third, fourth seasons aired in 2006, 2007, and 2008 respectively. Camp Orange was hosted by Maude Garrett from 2006 onwards.  In 2009, the highly successful fifth series, Camp Orange: The Final Frontier, brought a positive element into the competition by advising teams to "play nice" to be voted for the title of "Champ Orange" by their teammates. The latest version of Camp Orange has been Camp Orange: Spill Seekers. Juice is another weekday morning show. It shows popular Nicktoons between 7 am and 9 am such as SpongeBob SquarePants and The Adventures of Jimmy Neutron: Boy Genius. Although the show was originally hosted, it no longer features a host.

Kids' Choice Awards

The annual awards show commenced in 2003, celebrating kids' favourite choices in music, movies, books and more.

Programming blocks
 Nick at Nite - From Nickelodeon's opening date until July/August 2000, Nickelodeon shared its channel with an Australian version of Nick at Nite. Much of the programming was similar to the US channel at the time, including shows such as Mister Ed and Gilligan's Island. Eventually it was closed due to the expansion of Nickelodeon, as well as the existence of another classic TV channel, TV1, co-operated by another Viacom subsidiary, Paramount Pictures. Much of the programming was moved to TV1 and later some of it to the Sci Fi Channel.

 Sarvo - a block shown on weekday afternoons that was previously hosted by James Kerley and Dave Lawson. The duo left sarvo on Friday, 23 February 2007. The new series which began on 9 April 2007, and is now hosted by Maude Garrett and Kyle Linahan. sarvo airs in the afternoons and plays various Nicktoons such as SpongeBob SquarePants, Kappa Mikey, and Captain Flamingo as well as other shows such as Zoey 101. As well as children's programs, this show also offers other things such as interviews with celebrity guests and funny extras of what the hosts get up to. It has now ended and Maude & Kyle has since left Nickelodeon Australia.
 Weekend Mornings - a block of two episodes each of four Nicktoons on Saturday and Sunday mornings. It was originally named Double Up but changed names to support Nickelodeon's new format in 2006.
 Saturday Nick Television - a morning show that was launched in 2002 with the help of Britney Spears. This show was shot in Melbourne and involved games in which the live audience could participate in, celebrity interviews, performances, skits and more. Nickelodeon canceled the show in 2005 due to a lack of audience numbers.
 Lunchtoon - a weekday lunchtime block that has four half-hour episodes of a Nickelodeon show. It is usually played from 12 pm to 2 pm.
Toons2Nite - played classic Nickelodeon shows such as Rocko's Modern Life and Aaahh!!! Real Monsters in the late night hours of weeknights. It was originally named Classics, however it has since been rebranded Toons2Nite. It now shows a wide range of cartoons on every night.

Other projects

Nick Takes Over Your Beach
Over the summers of 1995, 1996, 1998, 1999, 2000 and 2004, Nickelodeon toured Australian beaches, setting up games and activities.

Nickelodeon Magazine Australia
The Australian Nickelodeon Magazine was a monthly magazine available in most newsagents and supermarkets between September 2005 and May 2006. The US version of the magazine was sold in some Australian newsagents and supermarkets from 1995, coinciding with the opening of Australian pay TV providers Galaxy (Australian television) in January and Foxtel in October 1995. The Australian version was created in 2005. In total, six issues of the Australian "Nickelodeon Magazine" were published before being dropped by Australian Consolidated Press. It was edited by former Australian Disney Adventures contributor, Santi Pintado. The Australian Nickelodeon Magazine content was borrowed heavily from its US counterpart, Nickelodeon Magazine. The first copy of the magazine was handed out free at the 2005 Nickelodeon Australian Kids' Choice Awards.

You're on Nick
To support Nickelodeon Australia's new format, the network launched Moby Nick, a bus that would tour around Australia in places such as Sydney Olympic Park. Part of the bus was a small recording studio, where kids could say a sentence or two about what they could do, or who they were. The ten-second clips would be shown during the ads on Nickelodeon Australia shows.

Slimefest
Slimefest is the world's only slime-filled annual music festival for kids. Introduced in Sydney in September 2012, the first line up included Jessica Mauboy, Stan Walker, Justice Crew, Guy Sebastian, Reece Mastin, Johhny Ruffo and Christina Parie.

The 2013 line-up included headliners Big Time Rush, along with performances by Guy Sebastian, Justice Crew, Samantha Jade, Heffron Drive and Jadagrace.

The year 2014 saw the festival to tour both Sydney and Melbourne, with performances by Cody Simpson, Savage, Justice Crew, Sabrina Carpenter, The Collective, Alli Simpson, Ricki Lee (Sydney) and Dami Im (Melbourne).

Hosts

Current

Past
 Angus King (1998–1999): Hot Chunks
 Jamie Croft (2003): sarvo
 Josh Quong Tart (2003): sarvo
 Dave "Kambo" Kambouris (2002–2003): sn:tv, Nickelodeon Australian Kids' Choice Awards (2003)
 Dave Lawson (2002–2007): sn:tv, Nick Takes Over Your School, Camp Orange, sarvo, Nickelodeon Australian Kids' Choice Awards (2005 and 2006)
 Natalie Garonzi (2002–2003): sn:tv, Nickelodeon Australian Kids' Choice Awards, sarvo
 Tony Brockman (2003–2005): sarvo, Nickelodeon Australian Kids' Choice Awards (2004)
 James Kerley (2003–2007): sarvo, Nickelodeon Australian Kids' Choice Awards (2004, 2005 and 2006)
 Emily Perry (2004–2005): sn:tv
 Jesse Tobin (2004–2005): sn:tv
 Maude Garrett (2006–2009): Camp Orange: Slimey Hollow, Camp Orange: The Mystery of Spaghetti Creek, Camp Orange: The Curse of the Emerald Eye, sarvo
 Kyle Linahan (2007–2009): sarvo
 Luke & Wyatt (Luke Ryan and Wyatt Nixon-Lloyd) (2010–2015): Camp Orange
 Kristy (Kristy Best) (2016–present): Slime Cup

See also
Nickelodeon Australian Kids' Choice Awards
Nick Jr. (Australia)
NickMusic (Australian TV channel)
Nickelodeon (United States)

References

External links

Australia and New Zealand
Television channels and stations established in 1995
English-language television stations in Australia
Children's television channels in Australia
Television channels in New Zealand
1995 establishments in Australia
English-language television stations in New Zealand
2010 establishments in New Zealand
Television stations in Fiji